Seggauberg is a former municipality in the district of Leibnitz in the Austrian state of Styria. Since the 2015 Styria municipal structural reform, it is part of the municipality Leibnitz.

Geography
Seggauberg lies about 35 km south of Graz between the Sulm valley and the Mur valley.

References

Cities and towns in Leibnitz District